The Couzinet 40 was a mailplane built in France in the early 1930s.

Design
The Couzinet 40 was a five-seat low-wing monoplane of all-wood construction.

Specifications

References

1930s French mailplanes
Trimotors
Low-wing aircraft
40
Aircraft first flown in 1932